Michael Oluwaseyi Ayo (born 5 March 1989), known by his stage name Faith Child, is a British Christian rapper. He has released two chart-topping studio albums, Illumination in 2009, and Airborne in 2015.

Early life
Faith Child was born Michael Oluwaseyi Ayo on 5 March 1989, in London, England, to a mother of four children. Her motto was; "'Don't abort the baby, I have put him there for a plan and a purpose and when he grows up he will be a man after my heart and he will serve me.'"

Music career
Faith Child's music career started in 2000 at age 11 when he was in a group called Godz Inheritorz, in which he did his first UK support tour on the Phat'N'Heavy tour. After the group disbanded a couple of years later, Faith took time to focus on his education. Still making music under the radar during his Secondary school education, he was called to feature on Praise Project by L'Dubzy in 2005 and then shortly after in 2007 featured on nationwide hit 'Bibles, Bibles' by Simply Andy.

In 2008, Faith Child released his debut official single, "I Like It", and this was followed-up by "Flashback" in November 2009 and then his debut studio album, Illumination in December 2009 His subsequent studio album, Airborne, was released in 2015.

He won best Best Gospel Act at MOBO Awards 2015. The rapper was previously nominated for this category in 2010 and had since swept up multiple accolades and become one of the most formidable live performers in the field. His latest album Airborne raced to the Top 5 of the UK Christian and Gospel charts a few months ago. He has opened for MOBO Award winner Tinie Tempah and shared the stage with the likes of Lecrae, Terrell King, and Kirk Franklin, to name a few.

Along with 'Airborne', Faith acquired a number of awards, nominations, and accolades resulting in him touring 12 countries across four continent in 2016, as well as meeting the President of Slovenia whilst on tour there and closing 2016 with a performance for the Mayor of London, Sadiq Khan, at the Mayor's Christmas Carol Service.

Discography
Studio albums
 Illumination (2009, Independent)
 Airborne (2015, Independent)

References

External links
 Official website
 New Release Today profile

1989 births
Living people
British performers of Christian hip hop music
English Christians
English male rappers
English songwriters
Rappers from London
British male songwriters